Roman's Pizza is a South African-based pizza restaurant chain franchise founded in 1993. Originally named Little Caesar's (copied from the American brand Little Caesars pizza) when it was founded by Arthur Nicolakakis in Pretoria.  The chain was rebranded in 2002 and renamed Roman's Pizza.  The company is known for its two for one pizza promotions with a business model that seeks to minimize prices whilst maintaining quality.

Controversies 
The company's CEO John Nicolakakis was involved in a minor controversy in 2018, when he was recorded making threatening remarks about rival pizza restaurant chains stating that he would "burn them down" and "go to war with them".

The company had to issue an apology to a Durban-based franchisee in 2015 and pay R200,000 for refusing to allow the franchisee to open a halaal franchisee. The given reason at the time for the refusal was that the franchisee was not Muslim.

See also 
 List of pizza chains
 List of pizza franchises
 List of pizza varieties by country

References 

Fast-food franchises
Pizza chains of South Africa
Pizza franchises
Restaurants established in 1993
Companies based in Johannesburg
Fast-food chains of South Africa
1993 establishments in South Africa